J. Van Drongelen 1 was a locomotive built by Crenstein, serial number 6398, in 1914 for construction company J. Van Drongelen in Hoek (The Netherlands). The locomotive was engaged in the construction of the Zeeuwsch-Vlaamsche Tramweg-Maatschappij (ZVTM) lines until its sale in 1917 to the Centrale Limburgsche Spoorweg (CLS). It remained in service until 1921 and was sold in 1924.

References

Steam locomotives of the Netherlands
Crenstein locomotives
Standard gauge locomotives of the Netherlands